Joseph Ashe may refer to:

Sir Joseph Ashe, 1st Baronet (1618–1686), English MP for Downton
Joseph Ashe (English politician) (c. 1684–1725), English MP for Chippenham
Joseph Ashe (Irish politician) (1717–c. 1760), Irish MP for Trim